In Greek mythology, Perigune (Ancient Greek: Περιγούνη) was the beautiful daughter of Sinis. Her name is also spelled Perigouna, Perigone, and as Perigenia in Shakespeare's A Midsummer Night's Dream.

After Theseus killed her father, she hid herself in a bed of rushes and asparagus. Theseus was unable to find her, but it was said that she revealed herself anyway after he promised not to harm her. She later bore Theseus`s  first male heir, Melanippus, who became the ancestor of the Ioxids of Caria. Perigune later married Deioneus of Oechalia.

References

Princesses in Greek mythology